In chess, a king hunt is a tactical motif in which the opponent's king is exposed and subjected to a series of checks. Sometimes the king is drawn across the board and is mated in enemy territory.

Example 
One of the most famous king hunts occurred in Lasker–Thomas, 1912. Lasker could also have mated via the more dramatic 8.0-0-0, rather than the quiet king move.

See also 
Chess tactic

References

External links 
 "Royal Walkabouts" by Edward Winter
 "Chaos in a Miniature" by Edward Winter

 Chess tactics